Senator Mullan may refer to:

Charles W. Mullan (1845–1919), Iowa State Senate
John B. Mullan (1863–1955), New York State Senate

See also
Robert Mullen (fl. 1860s–1870s), Nevada State Senate
Senator Mullin (disambiguation)